Basant Mosaad Mohamed Hassan (born 30 September 1993) is an Egyptian athlete specializing in high jump .

Career 
She competed at the 2010 Summer Youth Olympics, 2014 African Championships in Athletics in Marrakech, winning the silver medal, and 2016 African Championships in Athletics in Durban , winning the bronze medal, ahead of Lissa Labiche and Doreen Amata.

References

External links 

 Basant Mosaad Mohamed Hassane Athletics Africa

1994 births
Living people
Egyptian female high jumpers
Athletes (track and field) at the 2010 Summer Youth Olympics